Bushi or Kibosy (Shibushi or Kibushi) is a dialect of Malagasy spoken in the Indian Ocean island of Mayotte. Malagasy dialects most closely related to Bushi are spoken in northwestern Madagascar in the area of Antsiranana (Diego-Suarez) and Mahajanga (Majunga), which is also the closest point in Madagascar to Mayotte. Kibosy and Majunga together are considered one of the Malagasy languages by Glottolog.

Geographical distribution
Bushi is known as Kibushi on Mayotte and is spoken by 40% of the island's people (1980).  It is spoken alongside the Maore dialect (Shimaore), a Bantu language.  Historically, Kibushi and Shimaore have been spoken in certain villages but Shimaore tends to be the de facto indigenous lingua franca in everyday life because of the larger Shimaore-speaking population. Only Shimaore is represented on the local television news program by Réseau Outre-Mer 1re. Dialects of Bushi in Mayotte (known as Shibushi in Shimaore) include Kiantalaotse and Kibushi-Kimaore (Shibushi-Shimaore in Shimaore).

Bushi is spoken along the west coast of the main island (Grande-Terre) including the villages of Bambo Est, M'Boueni, Passy-Kéli, Mronabeja, Kani-Kéli, Chirongui, Poroani, Ouangani, Chiconi, Sohoa, M'Tsangamouji, Acoua, Mtsangadoua, and Handrema.

Phonology
In Mayotte, Bushi was traditionally written with an informal French-based Latin orthography.  On 22 February 2006, the  introduced an official alphabet that utilizes the basic Latin alphabet without c, j, q, and x and uses three extra letters: ɓ, ɗ, and n̈. Here, the letters used in the orthography are bolded, their IPA counterparts in brackets. On March 3, 2020, the  announced the adoption of official orthographies in both Latin and Arabic scripts for Kibushi.

Vowels 
Bushi has five vowels.

Consonants 
Bushi has 20 consonants.

See also
Mayotte: Languages

Notes

Languages of the Comoros
Languages of France
Malagasy language
Mahoran culture